Pheia utica is a moth in the subfamily Arctiinae. It was described by Herbert Druce in 1889. It is found in Mexico and Panama.

References

Moths described in 1889
utica